Serdang Hospital is a government-funded multi-specialty hospital located in Sepang District, Selangor, Malaysia. The location of the hospital borders the South Klang Valley Expressway (SKVE) to the east and the Faculty of Medicine and Health Sciences, Universiti Putra Malaysia (UPM) and the UPM own teaching hospital to the west. It is clearly seen from the North–South Expressway at the Kajang Interchange.

Construction

Serdang Hospital, which commenced operation on 15 December 2005, was built with the purpose of serving the roughly 570,000 population of Serdang, Putrajaya, Kajang and Bangi. It has a total area of 129,000 square metres and has 620 beds. The construction costs RM690 million and is one of the electronic hospital networks planned by the Malaysian Government. It was also listed as the IBS Project in Malaysia in 2005.

Design
From planning to construction, the hospital was built on the concept of 'hospital of the future'. Serdang Hospital is the first hospital in Malaysia to use aluminium coating to give it a shiny exterior. It is also the first hospital in Malaysia to use a futuristic cooling system to maintain the hospital temperature and reduce electricity usage.

Other unique features of this hospital are:
 Steel structure (total 6100 tonnage)
 Modular OT
 Rooftop garden (5 acres of the  total landscape area)
 Application of autoclave light concrete block (ALC)

The landscape of the hospital is also known to be therapeutic to the patients.

Services

The management of Serdang Hospital heavily relies on information technology and uses the 'Total Hospital Information System'.

It is designated as the reference center for cardiology, cardiothoracic, urology and nephrology surgery. The hospital will provide affordable, quality treatment for heart patients from the lower income group. The center will co-operate with the Hospital Selayang, which specialises in renal care and liver transplants.

In total, the hospital has 20 operating theatres, 19 wards and 620 beds.

Teaching Hospital
The hospital also serves as a teaching hospital for medical students from the Faculty of Medicine and Health Sciences, Universiti Putra Malaysia (UPM) and also University of Cyberjaya (UoC). Some students from other universities such as Universiti Kuala Lumpur Royal College of Medicine Perak (UniKL RCMP), Pusrawi International College Of Medical Science and UCSI University School of Nursing also do their elective posting attachments here.

References

External links
 Official Website

Hospital buildings completed in 2005
Hospitals in Selangor
Teaching hospitals in Malaysia
Hospitals established in 2005